Osteospermum tomentosum, the woolly boneseed, is species in the genus Osteospermum (daisy family) native to the Cape Province region of South Africa. In the past it was under the monospecific genus Inuloides as Inuloides tomentosa.

References 

Calenduleae